Dzhargalakh (Carğaalaax) is a rural locality (a selo), the only inhabited locality, and the administrative center of Verkhnebytantaysky Rural Okrug of Eveno-Bytantaysky National District in the Sakha Republic, Russia, located  from Batagay-Alyta, the administrative center of the district. Its population as of the 2010 Census was 269, down from 285 recorded during the 2002 Census.

References

Notes

Sources
Official website of the Sakha Republic. Registry of the Administrative-Territorial Divisions of the Sakha Republic. Eveno-Bytantaysky National District. 

Rural localities in the Sakha Republic